Pam Gosal (born 25 April 1972) is a Scottish Conservative politician who has been a Member of the Scottish Parliament (MSP) for West Scotland since May 2021. She is one of the first women of colour elected to the Scottish parliament, alongside Kaukab Stewart, and is also the first woman of Indian descent and practising Sikh to serve as an elected member of the Scottish Parliament.

Background
Pam Gosal was born in Glasgow, Scotland. She helped run her family business before working in Local Government prior to being elected to the Scottish Parliament.

Political career
Gosal stood in East Dunbartonshire at the 2019 United Kingdom general election and came in third place.

She ran in the 2021 Scottish Parliament election as the Conservative candidate for Clydebank and Milngavie and West Scotland. Gosal finished third in the Clydebank and Milngavie seat, but she was elected as a Member of the Scottish Parliament (MSP) for West Scotland. She is the first Sikh and first woman of Indian background to be elected as an MSP to the Scottish Parliament.

On 13 May 2021, Gosal and Stewart were sworn in as the first female MSPs of colour. She took her oath in Punjabi as well as English.

She is an advocate of introducing a domestic violence register in Scotland.

See also
 List of British Indians
 List of British Sikhs
 List of ethnic minority politicians in the United Kingdom

References

External links 
 

1972 births
Living people
Scottish Sikhs
People from East Dunbartonshire
Politicians from Glasgow
Scottish people of Indian descent
Conservative MSPs
Members of the Scottish Parliament 2021–2026
British politicians of Indian descent
Female members of the Scottish Parliament
Scottish Conservative Party parliamentary candidates